The 1915–16 season was the twenty-fourth season in which Dundee competed at a Scottish national level, playing in Division One, where they would finish in 16th place. Due to the ongoing First World War, the Scottish Cup was cancelled for the 1916–17 season. At the end of the season, due to travel difficulties during wartime, Dundee were asked to retire from the league at the end of the season.

Scottish Division One 

Statistics provided by Dee Archive.

League table

Player Statistics 
Statistics provided by Dee Archive

|}

See also 

 List of Dundee F.C. seasons

References 

 

Dundee F.C. seasons
Dundee